Aziz Court Imperial is a high-rise building  in Chittagong, Bangladesh. It is Located in Agrabad, the central business district. The construction of this building started in 2014 and was completed in 2017. It is the tallest building in Chittagong and the fifth tallest in Bangladesh.

See also
 List of tallest buildings in Bangladesh
 List of tallest buildings in Chittagong

References

Buildings and structures in Agrabad